Mazayev (masculine) or Mazayeva (feminine) is a Russian surname. Variants of this surname include Mazaev/Mazaeva, Masajew/Masajewa and Masaev/Masaeva.
The following people share this surname:
Musa Mazayev (born 1977), former Russian footballer
Sergey Mazayev (born 1959), Russian singer

Russian-language surnames
